Family Business is a six-part British television drama series, created and written by playwright Tony Grounds, that first broadcast on BBC1 on 11 February 2004. The series stars Jamie Foreman and Elizabeth Berrington as Marky and Jessica Brooker, the proprietors of a family-run building firm who, after years of hard work and graft, are due to move into the family home of their dreams – until the day of the move is unexpectedly rocked by the disappearance of their eldest child, James (Michael Tucek). The series was directed by Tom Shankland and Sarah Harding.

The series broadcast over six consecutive weeks, with the concluding episode on 17 March 2004. The series is yet to be released on DVD.

Inspiration
Tony Grounds said that the series was inspired by the builders who did up his house a few years prior to the series. "I had to get my house done up and I wondered about the significant reasons why people do that. Has someone died? Are they expecting a baby and need more space? Are they having a home refurbished to sell? And I thought that some builders must be privy to seeing families in quite heightened states."

Production
Tony Grounds said of the series' premise; "Everyone thinks that their family is imperfect, except Marky Brooker, whose family is so 'perfect' it's falling apart in front of his eyes and he can't see it. Family Business puts the modern British suburban family under the microscope." Greg Brenman, Head of Drama at Tiger Aspect, added: "On the surface, the Brookers are an ordinary family – close-knit loving and supportive of each other. Look a little closer, and the cracks begin to show."

BBC Head of Drama Commissioning, Gareth Neame, added: "We've been enthusiastic about working with Tony Grounds on a show about the modern British family for some time and we're delighted that Family Business will be his first drama series for BBC One. Tony's idiosyncratic style and his singular way of looking at the way we choose to live our lives make it a perfect accompaniment to other recent contemporary commissions."

Cast
 Jamie Foreman as Marky Brooker
 Elizabeth Berrington as Jessica Brooker
 Michael Tucek as James Brooker
 Meg Wynn Owen as Iris Brooker
 Trevor Peacock as Arthur Brooker
 Abbie Nichols as Lauren Brooker
 Claire Rushbrook as Rachel Brooker
 Ian Burfield as Mr. Adkins
 Danny Dyer as Yankie
 Ronnie Fox as Jethro
 Grace Monchar as Tulip

Episodes

References

External links

2004 British television series debuts
2004 British television series endings
2000s British drama television series
2000s British television miniseries
BBC television dramas
English-language television shows
Television shows set in London